"Ceasefire" is the twenty-third episode of the first season of the American television series M*A*S*H. It originally aired on March 18, 1973.

Plot

News of a ceasefire has reached the 4077th. Everyone celebrates and says their good-byes, except Trapper, who remains skeptical. The ceasefire does, of course, turn out to be a rumour, but not before Hawkeye tells three of his lovers he is married (which is a lie), shows the camp embarrassing pictures taken of General Clayton and Major Houlihan, forgives $1,500 worth of gambling debts, and gives away all of his possessions. Final appearance of Patrick Adiarte as Ho-Jon.

References

External links

M*A*S*H (season 1) episodes
1973 American television episodes